The Longview News-Journal is the major newspaper printed in the City of Longview, Texas.

Dating to 1871 under independent publishers, including James Hogg, later Texas governor, and Carl Estes, Longview civic figure, the publication was purchased by Cox Newspapers in the 1980s and sold by Cox to ASP Westward in 2009. It is closely affiliated with the Marshall News Messenger, another former Cox newspaper (published in nearby Marshall) which was sold to ASP Westward along with the News-Journal.

In 2012, ASP Westward announced the sale of the Longview and Marshall papers, along with 12 of its other non-daily East Texas papers, to Texas Community Media LLC, a new company formed by the longtime owners of the Victoria Advocate in South Texas.

The Longview News-Journal is now owned by M. Roberts Media which also owns: Victoria Advocate, Marshall News Messenger, Tyler Morning Telegraph, The Panola Watchman, and Kilgore News Herald.

Operating out of its modern 3-story brick editorial offices in downtown Longview, the News-Journal has a circulation in 11 East Texas counties to about 20,000 customers on weekdays. The daily Marshall News Messenger and Texas Community Media's 12 non-daily East Texas papers are produced in the News-Journal's newsroom and printed and distributed from its Longview production plant.

The newspaper's receptionist area contains several historical documents, including a copy of a telegram that Adolf Hitler wrote to the people of New London after the New London School explosion in 1937.

References

External links

Daily newspapers published in Texas
Longview, Texas
Publications established in 1871